The Brampton Fall Fair is an annual agricultural and entertainment event in Brampton, Ontario. It features agricultural displays, animals, 4H events, a midway, entertainment, demolition derby, and a Homecraft exhibit.

History
The first Brampton Fall Fair was held in 1853. During the early 1830s, farmers from the 212 farms of Chinguacousy Township, Ontario gathered at Martin Salisbury's Tavern for biannual fairs.

As the Industrial Revolution and other influences changed society, agriculture transformed from a subsistence process to a commercial industry, a change that was followed by an increase in demand for equipment, supplies, and power. The government created an act in 1853 to enable and assist counties in forming agricultural boards. The resulting government-funded organization was the County of Peel Agricultural Society.

In 1853, a small agricultural fair was set up by the organization and held to the west of Main and Queen Streets, near the current location of Brampton City Hall.

The event was modest overall. Prized horses and cattle were showcased, and whole grains, root vegetables, dairy and other produce were displayed for sale. One could suggest this was the precursor of today's Brampton Farmers' Market. This agricultural fair eventually became the modern Brampton Fall Fair.

The original fairgrounds spanned seven acres (28328.00m²) and were located at Wellington and Main Street. The land was  purchased in 1871 for $1235. This property was eventually sold to make way for the County Jail and Courthouse. The Peel Heritage Complex museum and art gallery now occupy the property. In 1884, the fairgrounds were relocated to thirteen acres {52609m²} of land on Elliot Street. According to Brampton: An Illustrated History, the land from the Elliot Street location was sold to the Agricultural Society by William McConnell, owner of the Brampton Driving Park.

Once a highlight for farmers, draft horse competitions were replaced in the 1920s by tractor demonstrations. Still, many of the Fair's displayed picks for top riding horses went on to win at the Canadian National Exhibition and Royal Agricultural Winter Fair.

The Junior Farmers' Building and the Memorial Arena were erected on the Brampton Fall Fair Elliot Street grounds in 1950, and the Brampton Curling Club was constructed in 1951. Because of its unique all-wood roof structure, Memorial Arena has recently been used for a Tim Hortons ad.  The Canadian curling-themed feature film Men with Brooms (2002), starring Paul Gross and Leslie Nielsen, was partially filmed at the Memorial and the Brampton Curling Club. A lacrosse box was added to the ground in 1971.

Most residents associate the Brampton Fall Fair with midway rides and games more than agriculture and handicrafts. This association began in 1975, with the addition of Campbell Amusements. The 1980s brought antique car shows to the fair, and the 1990s brought the demolition derbies.

Present
The Brampton Fair Grounds (Now Old Fairgrounds Park) were sold to the City of Brampton in March 1992, with the exception of the Brampton Curling Club properties.

In 1995, the Region of Peel Agricultural Society bought  of land at Heart Lake Road and Old School Road in Caledon, Ontario, moving the fair to that location in September 1997 for its 144th season. 

The new location includes the Peel Junior Farmers Hall (6,000 sq. ft.), meeting rooms, the Show and Sale Pavilion (33,000 sq. ft.), ten multi-purpose buildings, and outdoor show rings.

The Fall Fair's Homecraft Division, consists of arts & crafts, photography, handicrafts, needlework, baking and kitchen craft, gardening and flowers, fruits and vegetables, quilting, arrangements, and antiques. Many of these categories have both junior and adult versions. Special categories for developmentally challenged students have been introduced recently to the fair.

There was no Fall Fair in 2020.

Fairgrounds
There are four permanent structures on the fairgrounds:

 Main Fair Entrance, Fair Offices and Junior Farmer Hall
 Agricultural Display Building
 Livestock Show and Sales Building
 Multi-Purpose Building

Highlights
 165th
 September 15 - 16, 2018
 Theme: Into the Garden

Presidents

 1853 Peleg Howland
 1854 R.C. Smith
 1855-57 John Vodden
 1858 John Tilt
 1859-60 James Patterson
 1861-63 John Tilt
 1864-65 R.A. Hartley
 1866-67 Emerson Taylor
 1868-69 M. Perdue
 1870-72 J.P. Hutton
 1873 Wm. Elliott
 1874-75 John C. Spell
 1876-78 Rich Hamilton
 1879-80 James Jackson
 1881 John Smith
 1882-85 George Cheyne
 1886-88 J.P. Hutton
 1889-90 A.F. Campbell
 1890-91 S.J. Person
 1892 John Smith
 1893-94 J.J. Stewart
 1895-98 Robt. Crawford
 1899-1900 J.H. Watson
 1901-02 W.H. Rutledge
 1903-04 Dr. J.F. Quin
 1905-06 H.C.Clarridge
 1907-08 J.D. Orr
 1909-10 H.A. Dolson
 1911-12 F.J. Jackson
 1913 J.R. Cole & L.J.C. Bull
 1914 L.J.C. Bull
 1915-16 Darius McClure
 1917-18 Jas. Laidlaw
 1919-20 Albert Hewson
 1921-22 W.B. McCullock
 1923-24 W.J. Hunter
 1925-26 Dr. F. Hutchinson
 1927-28 Thos. Dolson
 1929-30 James Tilt
 1931-32 Frank Fenwick
 1933-34 W. Gladstone Shaw
 1935-36 W.L. Wilkinson
 1936-37 J.W. Crashley
 1937-38 Alex McKinney, Jr.
 1939-40 Wm. Bovaird
 1941 Charles R. Fendley
 1942 Charles London
 1943 Haddon Pegg
 1944-45 J.M. Fraser
 1946 Douglas S. Dunton
 1947-49 J.N. Duncan
 1950-51 Oscar Graham
 1952-53 J.W. Wiggins
 1954-55 Fred Gowland
 1956 C.M. Hutton
 1957-59 J.M. Brownridge
 1960-61 J.J. Shaw
 1962-63 L.R. Livingston
 1964-65 John H. McCulloch
 1966-67 Allen A. Andrews
 1968-69 Richard House
 1970-71 Donald A. Garbutt
 1972-73 Wm. Brander
 1974-75 Jack Klassen
 1976-77 Wm. Taylor
 1978-79 John M. McClure
 1980-81 J. Albert Dunn
 1982-83 David M. Julian
 1984-85 John Johnson
 1986-87 Jean House
 1988 Ross Milne
 1989-90 Fred Kee
 1991-92 Joanne Currie
 1993-95 Wm. R. Richardson
 1996-97 Ken Williamson
 1998-99 Trevor Small
 2000-01 Peter Armstrong
 2002-03 Bill Jackson
 2004-05 Tereska Matthews
 2005-06
 2006-07
 2007-08
 2008-09 
 2017 Al Woolley
 2018 Bill Morrison

Secretaries of the fair
Despite the job title, the position is equivalent to a manager.

 1857-70 John Lynch
 1871 A.B. Scott
 1872-74 D.L. Scott
 1875 J.P. Clark
 1876-85 A. Armour
 1886-1901 Henry Roberts
 1902-10 John Cooney
 1911-16 Miss. M.M. Kirkwood
 1917-23 John H. Watson
 1924-25 Robt. McCullock
 1926-35 T.W. Thomson
 1936 Frank Kitto, Wilma Snyder, Assistant
 1937 D.E. Smith
 1938-44 Fred McBride
 1945-69 H.J. Laidlaw
 1970-76 Robert J. Shaw
 1977-82 Jack Klassen
 1983 Pam Gillette
 1983-84 Leona Allen
 1985-88 Diane Irwin
 1988-89 Norma Reinhart
 1989-90 Vern Breen
 1990-96 Ken Ewan, Brenda Bebbington, Assistant
 1997-2018 Brenda Bebbington

See also
Other Canadian annual fairs
 Canadian National Exhibition - Toronto
 Calgary Stampede - Calgary
 Edmonton K-Days - Edmonton
 Pacific National Exhibition - Vancouver
 Central Canada Exhibition - Ottawa
 Canadian Lakehead Exhibition - Thunder Bay
 Markham Fair - Markham, Ontario
 Red River Exhibition - Winnipeg
 Royal Agricultural Winter Fair - Toronto
 Royal Manitoba Winter Fair - Brandon, Manitoba
 Schomberg Fair - Schomberg, Ontario
 Sooke Fall Fair - Sooke, British Columbia
 Streetsville Bread and Honey Festival - Mississauga
 Western Fair - London, Ontario

References

External links
 Brampton Fall Fair

Annual fairs
Culture of Brampton
Fairs in Ontario
Recurring events established in 1852
Fall Fair
Tourist attractions in Brampton
1852 establishments in Canada